Euphydryas orientalis is a small butterfly found in the Palearctic that belongs to the browns family.

Subspecies
E. o. orientalis Turkey, Transcaucasia
E. o. sareptensis (Staudinger, 1878) South Ural
E. o. emba (Fruhstorfer, 1917) Kazakhstan

See also
List of butterflies of Europe

References

Euphydryas
Butterflies described in 1851
Palearctic Lepidoptera